Gerbrandy is a West Frisian patronymic surname. Notable people with the surname include:

Pieter Sjoerds Gerbrandy (1885–1961), Dutch politician
Gerben-Jan Gerbrandy (born 1967), Dutch politician

See also
Gerbrandy Tower, radio tower in IJsselstein, Netherlands

Patronymic surnames
Surnames of Frisian origin